}}

The United States House of Representative elections of 2008 in North Carolina were held on 4 November 2008 as part of the biennial election to the United States House of Representatives.  All thirteen seats in North Carolina, and 435 nationwide, were elected to the 111th United States Congress.  The party primary elections were held 6 May 2008.

Carried on the coattails of Barack Obama winning the state in the presidential election, the Democrats added one seat to their seven won in 2006.  The Republican Party won the other five.  In the 8th district, Democrat Larry Kissell defeated incumbent Robin Hayes.  All other incumbents won re-election.  The Republicans' hold on the 10th district had been thought to be at risk by CQ Politics, but Republican Patrick McHenry won re-election.  The Democrats increased their total vote share by 1.5% statewide, and 2.5% if excluding the 1st, which the Republicans didn't contest in 2006.

It is not to be confused with the election to the North Carolina House of Representatives, which was held on the same day.

Summary

District 1
{{Infobox election
| election_name = 2008 North Carolina's 1st congressional district election
| type = presidential
| ongoing = no
| previous_election = 2006 United States House of Representatives elections in North Carolina#District 1
| previous_year = 2006
| election_date =  November 4, 2008
| next_election = 2010 United States House of Representatives elections in North Carolina#District 1
| next_year = 2010
| seats_for_election = North Carolina's 1st congressional district
| image_size = x150px
| image1 = File:GK Butterfield, Official photo 116th Congress (cropped).jpg
| nominee1 = G.K. Butterfield
| party1 = Democratic Party (United States)
| popular_vote1 = 192,765
| percentage1 = 70.00%
| image2 = File:3x4.svg
| nominee2 = Dean Stephens
| party2 = Republican Party (United States)
| popular_vote2 = 81.506
| percentage2 = 30.00%'| map_image =
| map_size = 
| map_caption =
| title = U.S. Representative
| before_election = G.K. Butterfield
| before_party = Democratic Party (United States)
| after_election = G.K. Butterfield
| after_party = Democratic Party (United States)
}}

This district, located in the northeastern portion of the state, is represented by Democrat G.K. Butterfield, who first won it in a 2004 special election. It is the only majority-black district in the state, and is overwhelmingly Democratic (Cook Partisan Voting Index of D+9).  It is one of the few districts in the former Confederacy that has not elected a Republican since the end of Reconstruction.  Butterfield was opposed by Republican William A. "Dean" Stephens. CQ Politics forecasted the race as 'Safe Democrat'.
Race ranking and details from CQ Politics
Campaign contributions from OpenSecrets

District 2

This district includes several suburban and rural areas near Raleigh, Rocky Mount and Fayetteville.  It has been represented by Democrat Bob Etheridge since 1997.  The district is a swing district on paper (CPVI of R+3); it narrowly supported Bill Clinton in 1992 and 1996, and gave equally narrow margins to George W. Bush in 2000 and 2004.  However, Etheridge is very popular in this area. In 2008, he faced his 2006 opponent, Republican Dan Mansell, and Libertarian Will Adkins. CQ Politics forecasted the race as 'Safe Democrat'.
Race ranking and details from CQ Politics
Campaign contributions from OpenSecrets

District 3

This district stretches along the northeastern and east-central portions of the state, including the Outer Banks.  It has been represented by Republican Walter B. Jones, Jr. since 1995.  Although Democrats have a 14-point plurality of registered voters, Jones had long been thought to have an unbreakable hold on this district.  Much of this area had been part of the 1st prior to 1993, and Jones's father, popular 14-term Democrat Walter Jones, Sr., is still an icon in this region.  However, Jones's voting record has shifted increasingly to the center for some time, and he has become one of the most vocal Republican opponents of the Iraq War.  This has caused considerable chagrin among Republicans in his district.  Onslow County Commissioner Joe McLaughlin announced in mid-2007 that he would challenge Jones in the Republican primary. Jones defeated McLaughlin in the May 6 primary, with about 60 percent of the vote. 2006 Democratic nominee Craig Weber won his party's primary over Marshall Adame, carrying about 70 percent of the vote.  The district has a CPVI of R+15—a three-way statistical tie for the most Republican district in the state, making it a very difficult pickup for Democrats on paper. CQ Politics forecasted the race as 'Safe Republican'.
Race ranking and details from CQ Politics
Campaign contributions from OpenSecrets

District 4

This district includes the heart of the Triangle area, including part of Raleigh and all of Durham and Chapel Hill, North Carolina.  It has been represented by Democrat David Price since 1997 (he previously represented the 4th from 1987 to 1995).  Despite a CPVI of only D+5, the influence of the state's three major research universities plus Price's status as an Appropriations subcommittee chairman (or "Cardinal") make Price a heavy favorite. Two Republicans competed in a May primary for the right to face Price: Augustus Cho and William (B.J.) Lawson. Lawson won, with about 70 percent of the vote. Libertarian Maximillian Longley also ran in the general election. CQ Politics forecasted the race as 'Safe Democrat'.
Race ranking and details from CQ Politics
Campaign contributions from OpenSecrets

District 5

Democrats Roy Carter and Diane Hamby filed to run against incumbent Virginia Foxx. Carter won the May 6 primary, with just over 50 percent of the vote. CQ Politics forecasted the race as 'Safe Republican'.
Race ranking and details from CQ Politics
Campaign contributions from OpenSecrets

District 6

Democrats Johnny J. Carter, Jay Ovittore, and Teresa Sue Bratton (campaign website) filed to run against incumbent Howard Coble. Bratton won the May 6 primary, with 61 percent of the vote. CQ Politics forecasted the race as 'Safe Republican'.
Race ranking and details from CQ Politics
Campaign contributions from OpenSecrets

District 7

Republican Will Breazeale opposed incumbent Mike McIntyre. CQ Politics forecasted the race as 'Safe Democrat'.
Race ranking and details from CQ Politics
Campaign contributions from OpenSecrets

District 8

Democratic nominee Larry Kissell won against incumbent Robin Hayes, reversing the result from 2006 when Kissell came up only 329 votes short of upsetting Hayes. Libertarian Thomas Hill also ran. CQ Politics rated it as 'No Clear Favorite', The Rothenberg Political Report as 'Toss-Up/Tilt Democratic', and The Cook Political Report as 'Republican Toss Up'
Race ranking and details from CQ Politics
Campaign contributions from OpenSecrets
Hayes (R-i) vs Kissell (D) graph of collected poll results from Pollster.comDistrict 9

Ross Overby and Harry Taylor ran in the Democratic primary, and incumbent Sue Myrick faced opposition from Jack Stratton in the Republican primary.  Taylor defeated Overby, with about 58 percent of the vote, while Myrick easily won re-nomination with 92 percent of the vote. Libertarian Andy Grum also ran in the general election. CQ Politics forecasted the race as 'Safe Republican'.
Race ranking and details from CQ Politics
Campaign contributions from OpenSecrets

District 10

Republican incumbent Patrick McHenry defeated Democratic nominee Daniel Johnson, but the margin of victory was McHenry's smallest to date. Johnson defeated Steve Ivester in the May 6 Democratic primary, with about 60 percent of the vote. McHenry won the Republican primary, garnering about 67 percent of the vote in a race against attorney Lance Sigmon. CQ Politics forecasted the race as 'Republican Favored', while Cook Political Report ranked it as 'Likely Republican'.
Race ranking and details from CQ Politics
Race Rankings from Cook Political Report
Campaign contributions from OpenSecrets
McHenry (R-i) vs Johnson (D) graph of collected poll results from Pollster.comDistrict 11

First-term incumbent Heath Shuler faced Carl Mumpower, who won a three-way Republican primary that included Spence Campbell and John C. Armor. Shuler was favored, since he did not face opposition from the man he defeated in 2006, former Rep. Charles H. Taylor. Libertarian Keith Smith also ran in the general election. CQ Politics forecasted the race as 'Safe Democrat'.
Race ranking and details from CQ Politics
Campaign contributions from OpenSecrets

District 12

Incumbent Mel Watt was the heavy favorite over little-known Republican and U.S. Army veteran Ty Cobb, Jr. (no known relation to the baseball legend, Ty Cobb). CQ Politics forecasted the race as 'Safe Democrat'.
Race ranking and details from CQ Politics
Campaign contributions from OpenSecrets

District 13

Incumbent Brad Miller faced Republican former state senator Hugh Webster, after easily defeating little-known Derald Hafner in the Democratic primary, with 88 percent of the vote. CQ Politics forecasted the race as 'Safe Democrat'.
Race ranking and details from CQ Politics
Campaign contributions from OpenSecrets

See also
North Carolina congressional districts

References

References
Congressional Wrap-up, Charlotte Observer, May 7, 2008
State Board of Elections: Primary Election Results
State Board of Elections: Candidate Filings
Libertarians File List of 2008 Candidates
Daily Reflector: Local Democrats celebrate taking top seats

External links
North Carolina State Board of Elections
U.S. Congress candidates for North Carolina at Project Vote Smart
North Carolina U.S. House Races from 2008 Race Tracker''
Campaign contributions for North Carolina congressional races from OpenSecrets

2008
North Carolina
United States House of Representatives